"Sometimes" is a song by Dublin-based alternative rock quartet Kodaline. The song was released on 6 March 2020 as the second single from the band's fourth studio album One Day at a Time. The song peaked at number ninety-four on the Irish Singles Chart.

Background
When talking about the song, Steve Garrigan said, "I wrote this song on tour in Asia last year, "I had a really bad day dealing with my own anxiety issues and I let it get the better of me. I started writing the song in my hotel room to help me calm down, music has always helped me in that way. For me, it’s a song about accepting the bad days and trying to stay positive."

Music video
A music video to accompany the release of "Sometimes" was first released onto YouTube on 23 March 2020.

Charts

Release history

References

2020 songs
2020 singles
Kodaline songs